Hasker and Marcuse Factory, originally part of the American Can Company, is a historic factory building located in Richmond, Virginia.  The original section was built in 1893 and expanded through 1915.  It is a four- to five-story, brick industrial building.  The factory housed manufacturers of printed, polychromatic tin boxes and tin tags (labels) for plugs of chewing tobacco.

It was listed on the National Register of Historic Places in 1983.  It is now the Church Hill House Apartments.

References

Industrial buildings and structures on the National Register of Historic Places in Virginia
Industrial buildings completed in 1893
Buildings and structures in Richmond, Virginia
National Register of Historic Places in Richmond, Virginia
Tobacco buildings in the United States
Apartment buildings in Virginia
1893 establishments in Virginia
American Can Company